Luis Caballero Holguín (27 August 1943 – 19 June 1995), born  in Bogotá was a Colombian painter, watercolourist, pastellist and lithographer. Caballero is known for depicting masculine figures, which often include both erotic and violent imagery. He is viewed as one of the most important figures in Colombian art.

Biography 
Caballero was raised in a conservative Catholic household. He studied at the University of Los Andes (Colombia) in 1961–62, where he met and was influenced by  etcher artist Juan Antonio Roda and art critic Marta Traba. He continued his  academic studies in Paris  at the Académie de la Grande Chaumière, graduating in 1964. It is during this time that he discovered Willem de Kooning, and Francis Bacon. Back in Colombia, in 1968, he won First Prize at the First Ibero-American Biennal of Medellín.

Caballero returned to Paris where he found more freedom in 1969 and lived there until 1995, when he returned to Bogota for a special exhibition of his work at the Luis Ángel Arango Library.

He died in June of the same year at the age of fifty-one.

His figurative works are usually large scale mixed media oil, ink, watercolor washes on either canvas or paper, sometimes incorporating fabrics or rope in a limited range of muted sepia colors, often representing male nude figures, in a contemporary style marked by classic training.

Publications and bibliography 
 Luis Caballero by Luis Caballero
 Luis Caballero : the male nude : May 3-May 29, 1994 by Luis Caballero
 Luis Caballero : paintings & drawings by Luis Caballero
 L. Caballero, Me tocó ser así 
 Barnitz, Jacqueline. Twentieth-Century Art of Latin America. Austin: University of Texas Press, 2001. 
 Rodríguez, Marta. Luis Caballero. Arte Nexus: Arte en Colombia 27 (January–March 1998): 121–23.
 Sokolowski, Thomas. Luis Caballero: Large Scale Drawings. New York: Nohra Haime Gallery, 1991. Catalogue of Exhibition, Grey Art Gallery, New  New York University's fine art museum, June 4-July 12, 1991.

References

External links 
 Issuu.com  "El deseo y el tormento secularizados en la obra de Luis Caballero"
 Colombia.co, Luis Caballero Holgin the naked truth behind evocative art

1943 births
1995 deaths
University of Los Andes (Colombia) alumni
Alumni of the Académie de la Grande Chaumière
20th-century Colombian painters
20th-century Colombian male artists
Gay artists
People from Bogotá
Colombian male painters
20th-century Colombian LGBT people